Safahat is the work of the Turkish poet, Mehmet Akif Ersoy, considered one of the last classic poets of Turkish literature.

The book consists of 7 booklets and includes 11.240 verses and 108 different poems. These 7 books are; Safahat (Articles, 1911), Süleymaniye Kürsüsünde (1912), Hakkın Sesleri (1913), Fatih Kürsüsünde (1914), Hatıralar (1917), Asım (1924), Gölgeler (1933).

Turkish poetry